David Aleksander Sjølie (born 7 May 1988) is a Norwegian jazz guitarist, known from bands like Mopti, married 31 July 2014, to the jazz singer Anja Eline Skybakmoen.

Career 
Sjølie was born in Oslo, where he lives and works as a musician, producer and studio engineer. He studied jazz and improvisation at the Norwegian Academy of Music (2013). As a performing musician, he is grounded in different musical traditions such as jazz, pop, country and rock, and is collaborating in bands like Mopti, Angus and Grandmas Grand. He is teaching guitar in Oslo.

Discography 
With Bendik Baksaas Band
2012: The Shape of Beats To Come (Dayladore Collective)
2013: 1991 (Aspén)

With Ine Hoem
2013: The Island (Impeller Recordings)

With Mopti
2013: Logic (Jazzland Recordings)
2015: Bits & Pieces (Jazzland Recordings)

With Lise Hvoslef
2014: Mapping the coincidence (Lise Hvoslef Records)

With Anja
2014: We're The Houses (Øra Fonogram)
2015: Echo'' (Triogram)

References

External links 

– Musikkhøgskolen var både fødestue og lekestue at Norwegian Academy of Music (in Norwegian)

21st-century Norwegian guitarists
Jazzland Recordings (1997) artists
Norwegian Academy of Music alumni
Norwegian jazz guitarists
Norwegian jazz composers
Musicians from Kongsberg
1988 births
Living people
Mopti (band) members